ISO 3166-2:PW is the entry for Palau in ISO 3166-2, part of the ISO 3166 standard published by the International Organization for Standardization (ISO), which defines codes for the names of the principal subdivisions (e.g., provinces or states) of all countries coded in ISO 3166-1.

Currently for Palau, ISO 3166-2 codes are defined for 16 states.

Each code consists of two parts, separated by a hyphen. The second part is three digits, which is the old FIPS 6-4 code of the state.

Current codes
Subdivision names are listed as in the ISO 3166-2 standard published by the ISO 3166 Maintenance Agency (ISO 3166/MA).

Click on the button in the header to sort each column.

Changes
The following changes to the entry have been announced by the ISO 3166/MA since the first publication of ISO 3166-2 in 1998.  ISO stopped issuing newsletters in 2013.

See also
 Subdivisions of Palau
 FIPS region codes of Palau

External links
 ISO Online Browsing Platform: PW
 States of Palau, Statoids.com

2:PW
ISO 3166-2
Palau geography-related lists